Arturo Medina (1898 – 1980) was a Chilean athlete. He competed in the men's javelin throw at the 1920 Summer Olympics.

References

1898 births
1980 deaths
Athletes (track and field) at the 1920 Summer Olympics
Chilean male javelin throwers
Olympic athletes of Chile
Place of birth missing